Hippocampus severnsi (Severn's pygmy seahorse) is a synonym of Hippocampus pontohi, Lourie & Kuiter, 2008.

References 

severnsi
Fish described in 2008